Loving in Tandem is a 2017 Filipino romantic comedy film directed by Giselle Andres, starring Maymay Entrata and Edward Barber. It is their first acting project since their debuts as housemates in the 2016 longest-running reality show, Pinoy Big Brother: Lucky 7. It is under the production of Star Cinema and was released nationwide on September 13, 2017.

Synopsis
Shine (Maymay Entrata) is a jolly and happy-go-lucky girl who will do anything for her family. But when it comes to love, she hopelessly tries to find one and wishes to meet her one true love. Until one day, when she was praying to meet the love of her life, she unexpectedly meets Luke (Edward Barber), a rebellious and grumpy Filipino-American boy who was sent to the Philippines by his father from the United States. Despite their complete differences from each other, will they truly find love?

Cast

Maymay Entrata as Sunshine "Shine" Camantigue
Edward Barber as Prince Lucas "Luke" Oliver
Kisses Delavin as Jayzel
 Marco Gallo as Tope
Carmi Martin as Remedios "Aling Edios"
Ryan Bang as Gong Woo
Thou Reyes as Jordan
Ketchup Eusebio as Elong Camantigue
Kakai Bautista as Genina
Simon Pineda as Macmac Camantigue
Emman Dolores† as Teggy
April Matienzo
Tony Labrusca as Vince

Soundtrack
Michael Pangilinan and Marion Aunor recorded a version of Sponge Cola's single (originally by Gino Padilla), "Closer You and I". It was released on September 3, 2017, and served as the film's theme song.

References

2017 films
Philippine romantic comedy films
Star Cinema films
Filipino-language films
2017 romantic comedy films